Pararchaea is a monotypic genus of Polynesian shield spiders containing the single species, Pararchaea alba. It was first described by Raymond Robert Forster in 1955, and is only found on the Polynesian Islands.

See also
 List of Malkaridae species

References

Malkaridae
Monotypic Araneomorphae genera
Spiders of New Zealand
Taxa named by Raymond Robert Forster